Benin is a modern country in Africa.

Benin may also refer to:
Kingdom of Benin, a historical state in Western Africa
Republic of Benin (1967), a short-lived former state of Nigeria in 1967
Benin City, a city in Nigeria
Bight of Benin, a bight on the western African coast
Benin River, a river in southern Nigeria near the Egbema tribe
 Benin, a fictional, movie-only female villain in Bleach: Memories of Nobody

See also
Benen (disambiguation)